"Einstein on the Beach (For an Eggman)" is a song recorded by Counting Crows from the album DGC Rarities Vol. 1. It was included on the band's best-of compilation, Films About Ghosts (The Best Of...). The title of the song was inspired by the Philip Glass opera Einstein on the Beach. The song became the band's first number one song on the Modern Rock chart, beating their previous highest-charting single, "Mr. Jones" which reached number two.  However, "Mr. Jones" stayed longer on the Modern Rock chart and became an enduring pop hit, whereas "Einstein" failed to achieve the same success.

Although the song only charted in the United States, it ranked at number 47 on the Australian Triple J Hottest 100 for 1994, one position above "Mr. Jones".

Background
According to Counting Crows frontman Adam Duritz, "Einstein on the Beach" was first recorded around 1991, shortly after the band first formed, as a home recording. Duritz believed the song would have been ignored, so it was not included on the band's debut album, August and Everything After. In 1994, however, when Geffen Records asked Duritz for a song to include on the rarities album DGC Rarities Volume 1, he allowed them to use "Einstein on the Beach" on the compilation. Upon hearing it, the label saw the song as a hit, so it was serviced to radio stations and gained popularity, reaching number one on the Billboard Alternative Songs chart for the week of August 13, 1994. This success caused Duritz dismay, as he was afraid the listeners of their songs would turn on them due to overexposure (citing fellow rock band Hootie & the Blowfish as an example), so the band scaled down their promotion and refused to make a music video for their single "Rain King".

The message of "Einstein on the Beach" can be seen as the achievements that come about by accepting failure, although Duritz claimed the song was a facetious creation. In an interview with Songfacts, Duritz did admit the song had some meaning, saying, "It sort of takes the idea of, what if you're someone who's a brilliant mathematician like Albert Einstein or any of us doing creative work on something that seems so clean and brilliant, and then it turns out to be an atomic bomb. It's your idea, which is so amazing and graceful in and of itself, but it turns into something not so great." Duritz also stated he liked the song, specifying its good harmony and the enthusiasm of his voice, and he still listens to it occasionally.

Charts

Weekly charts

Year-end charts

See also
 List of Billboard Modern Rock Tracks number ones of the 1990s

References

External links
 Einstein on the Beach (For an Eggman) by Counting Crows at Songfacts

1991 songs
1994 singles
Counting Crows songs
Song recordings produced by T Bone Burnett
Songs about Albert Einstein
Songs written by Adam Duritz
Songs written by David Bryson